The Odeon Cinema, Weston-super-Mare in Somerset, England, is an art deco cinema building, designed by Thomas Cecil Howitt. Still largely intact and retaining its originally installed Compton organ, it is a Grade II listed building.

Background
After working in Nottingham's city engineer's department, Howitt joined private architectural practice, where he was asked by Odeon Cinemas to design four new buildings for them, in Clacton, Bridgwater, Warley and Weston-super-Mare. All of the designs based around a common theme, incorporating: a square tower; squat main building; projecting slab roof, supported by columns. The Clacton and Warley buildings have since been demolished.

Exterior
In Weston, the tower is positioned at the corner of the site, above and behind the foyer. A curved canopy projects outwards from the slab tower, while the foyer is accessed from the street via four circular steps leading to five sets of double doors. Howitt used a second smaller tower to the left of the slab tower (when looking towards the building from Regent Street), with a large double-height metal framed window. There are two three storey high wings which enclosed the original single auditorium, allowing commercial revenue from shop units at street level and offices above. The Regent Street elevation comprises three bays with Crittall-style metal framed windows, while the Walliscote Road elevation comprises five bays. There was an additional canopy along both elevations, but these were later removed.

The facade of the building is covered in biscuit-coloured faience, except the shop areas on both wings which are clad in black glass Vitrolite panels. The basket-weave pattern faience encompasses three horizontal bands of green faience. At night neon lighting placed in line with the green faience, around the 'Odeon' and along the edge of the canopies provided an a-typical Art Deco attractive feel to the building. The original Odeon lettering has been replaced, despite this occurring after the building was listed.

Interior
The original split-level auditorium was split into three smaller units in 1973, with a fourth screen added in 1991. Many of the original art deco features however survive, including the Compton organ.

Compton organ
Installed during the original fitting out of the building in 1935, the 3manual/6rank instrument is the only Compton theatre pipe organ in an Odeon cinema outside London, and one of only two working theatre organs left in the country still performing in their original location in commercially operating cinemas, the other being in the Odeon Leicester Square, London. The six ranks of pipes are: Tuba; Tibia Clausa; Vox Humana; Oboe; Flute; Cello. Although the organ does not have the common Compton feature of a Melotone, it does have a rare Solo Cello stop which involves a mechanical bow and pitching fingers, operated directly from the organ console. The organ today is preserved under the care of the West of England Theatre Organ Society, and occasional organ concerts continue to be held at the venue.

Present
The building was awarded Grade-II listed status on 21 August 1986.

References

External links
Odeon Cinema, Weston-super-Mare
West of England Theatre Organ Society

Buildings and structures completed in 1935
Buildings and structures in Weston-super-Mare
Cinemas in Somerset
Grade II listed buildings in North Somerset
Weston-super-Mare
Streamline Moderne architecture in the United Kingdom